Janneke van Tienen (born 29 May 1979 in Mill) is a volleyball player from the Netherlands, who plays as a libero. She was a member of the Dutch National Women's Team that won the gold medal at the FIVB World Grand Prix 2007 in Ningbo, PR China.

Awards

Individuals
 2011 Montreux Volley Masters "Best Libero"
 2011 Montreux Volley Masters "Best Receiver"

References
 FIVB Profile

1979 births
Living people
Dutch women's volleyball players
People from Mill en Sint Hubert
Liberos
Sportspeople from North Brabant